The 2017 York Region Shooters season was the twentieth season in the club's participation in the Canadian Soccer League. Their season commenced on May 27, 2017 in an away match against Scarborough SC. The season concluded with York Region winning their third CSL Championship, after defeating Scarborough in a penalty shootout.

Summary 
York Region entered the 2017 season as the defending regular season champions with Tony De Thomasis continuing his role as head coach. Though their reserve team were the 2016 Second Division champions it was disbanded for the 2017 season. Their season started brightly with the Shooters achieving points in their first four matches, until conceiving their first defeat in the fifth week. The remainder of the season saw York Region clinch a postseason berth by finishing third in the standings with the best defensive record in the division. Their playoff journey began with a victory after Milton SC  forfeited their match. In the second round of the postseason they defeated the Serbian White Eagles FC, and ultimately claimed their third CSL Championship by defeating Scarborough SC in the finals.

Competitions

Canadian Soccer League

League table

First Division

Results summary

Results by round

Matches

Statistics

Goals and assists 
Correct as of November 10, 2017

References 

York Region Shooters
York Region Shooters
York Region Shooters seasons